Ramsar Hotel, also known as Grand Ramsar Hotel, Ramsar Old Hotel and, Ramsar Azadi Hotel was a hotel in a resort in Ramsar, Mazandaran. The resort includes a hotel, as well as a range of new and old coastal motels. It housed more than 160 luxury rooms and suites with modern facilities. The hotel, built-in 1933 during the Pahlavi period, has beautiful architectural properties in the city center.
As of now Ramsar old Hotel no longer houses guests and is abandoned. The guests are stationed in a newly built hotel not far from the old one.

Gallery

See also
Tourism in Iran

References

External links
 Ramsar Parsian Hotel Official Website
 Parsian International Hotel Group Official Website

Hotels in Iran
Buildings and structures in Mazandaran Province
Tourist attractions in Mazandaran Province
Ramsar County
Hotels established in 1933
Hotel buildings completed in 1933